Princess Hamnyeong was a Goryeo Royal Princess as the younger daughter of King Wonjong and Princess Gyeongchang who later married her third cousin once removed, Wang Hye the Duke Gwangpyeong (왕혜 광평공). In 1279, he got dispatched to Gyeongsang Province and supervised a battleship to be used to conquer the East alongside Tapnap (탑납) and Hapbaekna (합백나), envoys from Yuan dynasty. Then in 1285, Hye died and his properties were confiscated by King Chungnyeol.

References

Princess Hamnyeong on Encykorea .

Year of birth unknown
Year of death unknown
Date of birth unknown
Date of death unknown
Goryeo princesses